The Midwest Region is one of ten United States regions that currently send teams to the Little League World Series, the largest youth baseball competition in the world. The region's participation in the LLWS dates back to 1957, when it was known as the Central Region. However, when the LLWS was expanded in 2001 from eight teams (four U.S. teams and four "International" teams from the rest of the world) to 16 teams (eight U.S. and eight International), the Central Region was split into the Midwest and Great Lakes Regions. Starting in 2022, 8 teams will be represented at the Midwest regional with the addition of Wisconsin.

The U.S. states that are in Little League's Midwest Region:

Following the 2021 LLWS, Wisconsin has been moved from the Great Lakes Region to the Midwest Region. This move is a small part of a planned expansion of the LLWS from 16 to 20 teams. This expansion was originally scheduled to occur for 2021, but was delayed to 2022 due to the COVID-19 pandemic.

Regional championship
Winner is indicated in green.

2001–2021

2022–present

LLWS results
As of the 2022 Little League World Series.

Results by state
As of the 2022 Little League World Series.

See also
Little League World Series (Central Region)

References

External links
Official site
Midwest Region Little League Tournament Historical Results

Midwest
Baseball competitions in the United States
Sports in the Midwestern United States
2001 establishments in the United States
Recurring sporting events established in 2001